Air Zermatt AG is a Swiss airline and flight school based in Zermatt. The company has an office at the Aéroport de Sion in the canton of Valais and bases in Gampel, Raron and Zermatt. It employs approximately 65 people.

History

Air Zermatt was founded in 1968.

In 1973 Air Zermatt introduced medicalization in helicopter rescue. As the first rescue company in Switzerland, it employs permanent doctors and paramedics who accompany the helicopter crews on their rescue missions.

In March 2020, Air Zermatt and Air-Glaciers announced a merger. Regional anchoring for both companies will remain and they will both have their own board of directors and CEO.

Fleet

The Air Zermatt fleet consists of the following aircraft (as of January 2020):

Media

From July to August 2006, Schweizer Radio DRS made a documentary series called Die Bergretter - en route with Air Zermatt about the company and its employees. The seven-part series was broadcast from May 2007. A sequel followed in winter 2007/2008 which was shot in February 2007 as a "winter season".

In 2010, Air Zermatt was part of a documentary by Swiss Schweizer Radio und Fernsehen, titled The mountain rescuers in the Himalayas wherein the airline, in cooperation with Fishtail Air, was establishing a mountaineering rescue station in Lukla.

In January 2017, rescues from the recent past were shown on ServusTV.

Former Air Zermatt pilot Siegfried Stangier wrote a book entitled Rescuers who come from heaven (published in 1986), which gives an insight into Air Zermatt's activities from the 1970s to the mid-80s. The long-line rescue method he introduced in 1972 (a rope up to 220 meters long on the helicopter) saved the lives of countless people in need.

In 2016, the series "The Horn" was released on Netflix, which in addition to the way the company works, shed light on individual employees and assignments.

References

External links
 

Airlines of Switzerland
Helicopter airlines
Airlines established in 1968